Easy Living or Easy Livin' may refer to:

Films 
 Easy Living (1937 film), a screwball comedy directed by Mitchell Leisen
 Easy Living (1949 film), starring Victor Mature and directed by Jacques Tourneur
 Easy Living (2017 film), starring Caroline Dhavernas

Music

Albums 
 Easy Living (Paul Desmond album), 1966
 [[Easy Livin' (Clare Fischer album)|Easy Livin''' (Clare Fischer album)]], 1966
 Easy Living (Ella Fitzgerald album), with Joe Pass, 1986
 Easy Living (Etta Jones album), 2000
 Easy Living (Frank Morgan album), 1985
 Easy Living (Ike Quebec album), 1987
 Easy Living (Enrico Rava album), 2003
 Easy Living (Sonny Rollins album), 1977
 Easy Livin': Singles A's & B's, an album by Uriah Heep, 2006

 Songs 
"Easy Living" (song), a song written by Ralph Rainger and Leo Robin for the 1937 film
"Easy Livin'" (song), a 1972 song by Uriah Heep
"Easy Livin'", a 1983 song by Fastway from the album Fastway"Easy Living", a song by Catherine Britt from the album Dusty Smiles and Heartbreak Cures"Easy Living", a song by Gluecifer from Basement Apes''

Other uses 
 Easy Living (magazine), a magazine published by Advance Publications
 Easy Living, a brand of interior paint produced by Sears Holdings